Howard Murphy (January 1, 1882 – October 5, 1926)  was a Major League Baseball outfielder. His minor league baseball career spanned sixteen seasons, from  until . After his playing career, Murphy served as head baseball coach at Decatur Baptist College.

References

External links

1882 births
1926 deaths
Major League Baseball outfielders
St. Louis Cardinals players
Memphis Egyptians players
Baton Rouge Cajuns players
Texarkana Casketmakers players
Baton Rouge Red Sticks players
Pine Bluff Lumbermen players
Kansas City Blues (baseball) players
Louisville Colonels (minor league) players
Decatur Commodores players
Oakland Oaks (baseball) players
Mobile Sea Gulls players
Great Falls Electrics players
Salt Lake City Skyscrapers players
Shreveport Gassers players
Sherman Lions players
Tulsa Producers players
Dallas Baptist Patriots baseball coaches
Baseball players from Alabama